Aam Khas Bagh is the remains of a highway-inn constructed for the use of royalty as well as common people. It was divided into two parts - the Aam for public use and the Khas for private use by the Royalty. This Royal inn was initially built by Akbar and planned by Mughal architect Hafiz Rakhna. It was rebuilt by Mughal Emperor Shah Jahan along the Mughal military road between Delhi and Lahore. The Royal couple used to stay here in the old building complex while going to and coming back from Lahore. Later on, some additions were made to this monument by Mughal Emperor Jahangir.

Aam Khas Bagh complex
The complex was famous for a perfect air-conditioning system called Sarad Khana. The Sheesh Mahal of the Daulat-Khana-e-Khas, the hamam and the tank had unique methods of heating water. The palace compound also had a set of fountains. Water for the fountains was drawn from a huge well nearby and circulated through underground conduits. A beautiful garden and the nursery are being maintained. It is a Mughal type garden. The old complex, which has archaeological value, is being maintained by the Archaeological Survey of India. The area was maintained until a few years ago. The buildings which are in worst condition include Daulat Khana Khas, Sard Khana and Shahi Hamaam. Lack of upkeep has ruined these buildings.

The complex also has an orchard spread over 11 acres of land. The orchard has mango, pear and guava plantations and some trees are more than 70 years old.

Monuments
The following monuments are situated in the vicinity of Aam Khas Bagh:

Sard Khana - This monument was built by Emperor Jahangir. This is an air conditioned chamber of that time. The water was pulled through large pulleys from the adjoining well and was passed through water channels running through the walls of this building and was used for fountains and waterfalls.
Sheesh Mahal - This beautiful building was known as Daulat-Khana-E-Khas and Sheesh Mahal. It was built by the orders of Emperor Jahangir. There have been some subsequent alterations to the original building. The domes of this monument were decorated with glazed tiles, some of which are still visible today.
Hamam - This monument was constructed by the orders of Emperor Jahangir. In this, water was taken through underground terracotta channels and a unique method of heating the water was adopted.
Tank - This tank was constructed by the orders of Emperor Jahangir. There was a Mehtabi-Chabutra in the centre which has fallen down. On the east and west sides of this tank, quarters for Mughal employees were built.
Daulat Khana-E-Khas- This double storeyed monument was built by Mughal Emperor Shah Jahan as his private residence. All the rooms and main walls of this building were decorated with designs. The central hall measured 18 x 14 and eastern walls were having two tall minarets. On the northern side there were many tanks and fountains which added to the grandeur of the building.

Light and sound show
During the famous Shaheedi Jor Mela at Fatehgarh Sahib, the light and sound programme regarding the history of Sirhind and the martyrdom of younger sons of Guru Gobind Singh in the form of Play - Sirhind Di Deewar is shown to the visitors at night in the Aam Khas Bagh.

Gallery

See also
Gurdwara Fatehgarh Sahib
Jahaz Haveli

References

External links 

Fatehgarh Sahib
Buildings and structures in Punjab, India
Mughal gardens in India
Monuments and memorials in Punjab, India
Ruins in India
Water Heritage Sites in India